Arkadaşım Hoşgeldin, was an entertainment program published in Turkey which was successor to Komedi Dükkanı and predecessor to Müdür Ne'aptın?

References

Turkish television series
Television shows set in Istanbul
Television series produced in Istanbul
Television series set in the 2010s